Sina Ataeian Dena (born 1983 in Ahvaz, Iran) is an Iranian film director, screenwriter and film producer.

Career 
Sina Ataeian Dena studied film directing at the Sooreh University of Art in Tehran. In 2009 his animated short film "Especially Music" won the international competition of the Tehran International Short Film Festival. Sina Ataeian Dena then realized his first full-length feature film Paradise (original title: Ma dar behesht). He was responsible for writing, directing, and producing the film with his production partner Yousef Panahi. The shoot took three years to complete, as the film did not receive official filming permission or governmental funding in Iran. Paradise, a drama about subliminal violence, centers around the life of a young woman in modern day Tehran who works as a teacher in a girls' school in the suburbs. Paradise had its World Premiere in 2015 in the main competition of the 68th Locarno Film Festival. It was nominated for the Golden Leopard and was awarded the Prize of the Ecumenical Jury and the Swatch Art Peace Hotel Award. Subsequently, Paradise was shown at numerous international film festivals and won further nominations and awards. At the 15th Marrakech International Film Festival jury president Francis Ford Coppola gave Sina Ataeian Dena the Special Jury Award for Paradise.

In 2018, Ataeian Dena exhibited photographies and the video installation "Altering Realities" in the exhibition "Hidden Secret" alongside works by the artists Francis Alys and !Mediengruppe Bitnik in the contemporary art gallery Villa Merkel, Germany. The video installation "Home" was presented by Ataeian Dena in 2018 as part of the showcase "Studio Bosporus" at the Museum for the Present Hamburger Bahnhof, Berlin.

Filmography (selection)

Director, screenwriter and producer 

 2015: Paradise 
 2013: Wind in the Alley (Videoart)
 2013: Homo (Videoart)
 2006: Third Gender (Documentary)
 2004: Freak out (Videoart)

Director and screenwriter 
 2012: Arghaj (Documentary)
 2010: Life Tuning (Documentary)
 2009: Especially Music (Animation, Short)
 2009: Yar-e-dar (Short with animation)

References 

Iranian film directors
Iranian screenwriters
Iranian film producers
1983 births
Living people
People from Ahvaz